Great Temple is a general name for the most prominent temple of an ancient city. It may refer to:

 Great Temple of Abu Simbel
 Great Temple of Abydos
 Great Temple of the Aten
 Great Temple at Karnak
 Great Temples of Nanto (Nara)
 Great Temple (Petra)
 Great Temple of Ptah
 Great Temple of Templo Mayor
 Padangtegal Great Temple of Death